Aberfoyle may refer to:

Aberfoyle, County Londonderry, Northern Ireland
Aberfoyle, Stirling, Scotland
Aberfoyle, Ontario, Canada
Aberfoyle, Texas, United States
Aberfoyle, Warwick, a heritage house in Queensland, Australia

See also
Aberfoil, Alabama